Achorodothis is a genus of fungi in the family Mycosphaerellaceae.

References 

Dothideomycetes genera
Mycosphaerellaceae genera